The Valley Jr. Warriors are an American Tier III junior ice hockey organization playing in Haverhill, Massachusetts. They have two Tier III teams that play in the Eastern Hockey League (EHL) and the EHL Premier. The organization also fields a number of youth hockey teams at the Bantam, Peewee, and Squirt other various levels. The youth hockey teams compete in the Elite 9 Hockey League and the Mass State Select League. The teams play home games at the Haverhill Valley Forum in Haverhill, Massachusetts.

History
The Jr. Warriors were founded in 1996 in the Tier III Junior A Eastern Junior Hockey League (EJHL) until 2013 when Tier III junior hockey leagues underwent a reorganization that led to the dissolution of the EJHL and the Jr. Warriors to join the Atlantic Junior Hockey League. The AJHL then rebranded that season and became the Eastern Hockey League (EHL).

When the Jr. Warriors played in the EJHL, the organization also fielded a Junior B team of the same name in the Empire Junior Hockey League (EmJHL). In 2011, USA Hockey dropped the Junior A and B designations from Tier III hockey but the EmJHL continued to provide an organizational development team for their EJHL team, so the team is still referred to as Junior B. After the 2013 league reorganization, the EmJHL joined the United States Premier Hockey League and the Jr. Warriors B team joined the Metropolitan Junior Hockey League (MetJHL). 

In 2015, the EHL added an Elite Division and the teams that were already playing in the EHL were separated into a Premier Division. The Jr. Warriors switched their Junior B team from the MetJHL to the new EHL-Elite.

In 2017, the league re-branded, dropping the Premier name from their top division and renamed the Elite Division to Premier.

The Warriors have been coached by distinguished hockey players including Stephen Leach, Bob Sweeney, and Bob Carpenter.

Season-by-season records

References

External links
 Official Site

1996 establishments in Massachusetts
Haverhill, Massachusetts
Ice hockey clubs established in 1996
Ice hockey teams in Massachusetts
Junior ice hockey teams in the United States
Sports in Essex County, Massachusetts